A light deity is a god or goddess in mythology associated with light and/or day. Since stars give off light, star deities can also be included here. The following is a list of light deities in various mythologies.

African

Egyptian mythology
Khepri, god of rebirth and the sunrise
Nefertem, god who represents the first sunlight

Guanche
Magec, deity of the sun and light, exact gender unknown

Dahomean religion
Lisa, deity of the sun, heat, sky

American

Lakota mythology
Anpao, two-faced spirit of the dawn

Maya mythology
Tohil, god associated with thunder, lightning, and sunrise

Aztec
Centzonhuitznahua, 400 gods of the southern stars
Centzonmimixcoa, 400 gods of the northern stars
Cipactonal, god of the daytime
Citlālicue, goddess who created the stars
Citlalmina, goddess of female stars
Citlalatonac, god of male stars
Tianquiztli, star goddesses
Xiuhtecuhtli, god of fire, day, and heat

Incan
Inti, god of the sun
Ch'aska ("Venus") or Ch'aska Quyllur ("Venus star"), goddess of dawn and twilight, the planet
Mama Killa, goddess of the moon

Asian

Chinese
Zhulong, dragon deity of daylight

Hindu
Aruṇa, personification of the reddish glow of the rising sun
Dyaus Pita, continues the name of the Proto-Indo-European god of the day-lit sky
Ushas, dawn goddess

Sumerian
Inanna, primary goddess of the planet Venus
Ninsianna, goddess of the planet Venus
Šul-pa-e, underworld god who became associated with Jupiter
Shulsaga, stellar god
Aya (goddess), goddess of light and the dawn

European

Albanian
Nëna e Diellit, "the Mother of the Sun"
Dielli, personification of the Sun
Hëna, personification of the Moon
E Bija e Hënës dhe e Diellit, "the Daughter of the Moon and the Sun"
Prende, dawn goddess, also referred to as Hylli i Dritës, Afêrdita "the Star of Light, Afêrdita" (Venus)
Zojz, as a reflex of *Dyeus, god of the day-lit sky

Etruscan
Albina, goddess of the dawn and protector of ill-fated lovers
Thesan, goddess of the dawn, associated with new life

Germanic
Baldr, god thought to be associated with light and/or day; is known by many other names, all of which have cognates in other Germanic languages, suggesting he may have been a pan-Germanic deity
Dagr, personification of day
Earendel, god of rising light and/or a star
Eostre, considered to continue the Proto-Indo-European dawn goddess
Freyr, god of sunshine, among other things 
Teiwaz, as a reflex of *Dyeus, was probably originally god of the day-lit sky
Thor, god of lightning, thunder, weather, storms, and the sky

Slavic
Dazhbog, god of the sun and day

Greek
Aether, primarily associated with upper air but associated with light in Hesiod's Theogony
Apollo, god of light, among many other things
Eos, goddess of the dawn
Hemera, personification of day
Hyperion, Titan of light; sometimes conflated with his son Helios
Lampetia, goddess of light, and one of the Heliades or daughters of Helios , god of the Sun, and of the nymph Neera . 
Theia, Titaness of sight and the shining light of the clear blue sky. She is the consort of Hyperion and mother of Helios, Selene, and Eos.
Zeus, as a reflex of *Dyeus, could be considered god of the day-lit sky
Aphrodite, goddess of love and beauty.

Mari

Roman
Aurora (mythology), goddess of the dawn
Jupiter (mythology), as a reflex of *Dyeus, god of the day-lit sky
Mater Matuta, goddess associated with Aurora

Oceania

Polynesian
Atanua, Marquesan goddess of the dawn
Atarapa, goddess of the dawn
Ira, sky goddess and mother of the stars

Māori mythology
Ao (mythology), personification of light

See also
List of night deities
List of solar deities
Lucifer
Sky deity

References

Light